The NATION Movement (or NATION), is a Belgian far-right political party founded  on 9 August 1999, by nationalist politician Hervé Van Laethem in Belgium. The party is part of the larger far-right and right-wing populist movement in Belgium and has also been involved in the Yellow vests movement.

NATION maintains a YouTube channel, Télé NATION Info, where they broadcast rallies, protests, interviews and other content relating to the party.

History
On August 9, 1999, Van Laethem, along with two other individuals, formed the non-proft association Mouvement pour la Nation. The aim of this was, the dissemination and defence of nationalist ideas. The association developed into a political party and in a general meeting on September 28, 2008, it was decided to dissolve the association with NATION only existing as a fully fledged party.

In 2015 the party was a founding member of the far-right Alliance for Peace and Freedom European political party. The group, which also includes the Italian New Force and National Democratic Party of Germany, wishes to organise nationalist parties across the continent that are staunchly opposed to the European Union.

On January 12, 2019, the far-right New Alternative Wallonia (NAW) party merged with NATION. NAW President Salvatore Russo was made Vice President of NATION.

Protests and actions
When it was announced that Michelle Martin, accomplice of her husband's crimes of child molestation and murder, would be released from prison before her sentence was completed NATION took part in the numerous protests. Television station, RTL-TVI, reported that members of NATION had been visiting Halal shops wearing pig masks, however it was never confirmed that they were members of NATION.

It has been reported that Molenbeek-Saint-Jean is a safe haven for jihadists in relation to the support shown by some residents towards bombers who carried out the Paris and Brussels attacks. In response to this NATION organised a protest against then Socialist mayor, Philippe Moureaux. The party claims that Moureaux's due to his views and policies was responsible for a wave of terror attacks. Members of the party dumped manure outside of Moureaux's home.

NATION was involved in controversy when on July 23, 2016, members of the party burned the flag of the Islamic State at a medieval festival being held in the Bouillon Castle.

Belgian Yellow Vest Movement

Since the Yellow vests movement began in 2019 NATION have organised and partaken in similar Belgian based protests. In 2019, the president of the movement, Hervé Van Laethem, registered the trademark Yellow Vests from the Office of Benelux for Intellectual Property, justifying himself by saying it was in order to "prevent the term 'Yellow Vests' from being used any which way by anyone, especially in the context of the elections". NATION claims to be fully committed to supporting the Yellow Vest movement and blames liberal capitalism and Marxist socialism for causing civil unrest and societal issues.

Ideology
The party advocates: solidarism, the rejection of Islam, the opposition to immigration, and the defense of "European identity and civilization as well as its millennial culture by advocating "remigration". Through the party's official newspaper, NATION-Info, the party has supported revolutionary nationalism.

Electoral results

Chamber of Representatives

Walloon Parliament

Brussels Parliament

References 

Eurosceptic parties in Belgium
Far-right political parties in Belgium
Francophone political parties in Belgium
Nationalist parties in Belgium
Anti-Islam political parties in Europe
Anti-Islam sentiment in Belgium
Far-right parties in Europe
Right-wing populist parties
Third Position
Political parties established in 1999